Aaron Spiro (born January 20, 1975). He released, Sing, in 2002, with EMI/Sparrow Records.

Early life
Spiro was born on January 20, 1975

Music career
His music career commenced in 2001,

Discography
 “Shine Like The Sun” (1995), band release as Spiro and Furlan
 Sing (August 13, 2002) Artist release
 "The Cure" (2007) artist release
 "Elephant song" (2009) artist release
 "Love" (2011) artist release
 "The Owl Parliament" (2015) band release
 "Allotropes" (2014) producer/Engineer for Sporty Lee
 "Black Ocean Temple" (2016) producer/Engineer

References

1975 births
Living people
Musicians from Seattle
Songwriters from Washington (state)